, (born July 12, 1957) is a Japanese former professional baseball pitcher, the first-round draft pick of the Hiroshima Toyo Carp in 1975 and one of the most famous Japanese right-handed pitchers. He was known as the  because from his perfect control pitching, and his nickname was Pei-San (ペイさん).

He struggled his first few seasons, then went 17-11 with a 3.58 ERA to make his first All-Star team in 1979. It was the first of five consecutive All-Star picks for Kitabeppu, who helped the team to a Japan Series title in 1980.

In 1982 Kitabeppu went 20-8 with a 2.43 ERA, easily his best year to that point. He led the Central League with 267.3 innings, won the most games on the mound and was fourth in ERA. He won his first Eiji Sawamura Award that season and also was named to the Best Nine.

His streak of All-Star selections ended in 1984, though he continued to pitch well in '84 and '85. In 1986 Kitabeppu had his best season, going 18-4 with a 2.43 ERA. He led the circuit once again in victories, won his only ERA crown, led in complete games (17) and shutouts (4), won his only Gold Glove and in addition to the Best Nine and Sawamura, won his only MVP award as the Carp returned to the Japan Series, but failed to win.

Kitabeppu again was an All-Star in '88 but posted losing records from '87 through '89, once with an ERA of 5.48. The former star allowed the most runs in 1988 (87) and the most homers (22). The next season, he again surrendered the most home runs, also 22. In 1989 he was in the minor leagues for the first time in his career.

He emerged resurgent from his trials and after a decent season in 1990, in 1991 he went 11-4 with a 3.38 ERA. He made his seventh All-Star team in 1992, with 14 wins in 22 decisions, and a 2.58 ERA. It was his lowest ERA and most victories since his MVP season of '86. The Carp made their third Japan Series of the Kitabeppu era, but lost to the Seibu Lions. Still just 34, Kitabeppu reached 200 career wins.

It was his last good season – he would pitch 24 more games, going 9-9, with ERAs over 5 each time, before retiring. His career line with Hiroshima was 213-141 with a 3.67 ERA.

Since Kitabeppu, only one pitcher in Nippon Pro Baseball (Kimiyasu Kudoh) has reached 200 victories. Kitabeppu ranks 17th all-time in wins, 20th in innings (3,113), 26th in strikeouts (1,757), 9th in hits allowed (3,225) and 4th in homers surrendered (380, the Central League record).

After retiring, Kitabeppu became an announcer and then the pitching coach for the Carp.

Career 
 1st pitch, September 16, 1976
 1st win, October 12, 1976
 MVP in the Japanese Central League, 1986
 Eiji Sawamura Award winner, 1982 and 1986
 Greatest Number of Wins, 1982 and 1986
 Best Winning Average, 1980, 1981 and 1991
 Best ERA, 1986
 Best Nine of the year, 1982 and 1986
 Gold Glove Award winner, 1986
 Japan All-star game, 1979, 1980, 1982, 1983, 1984, 1988 and 1992
 Hiroshima Prefectural Prize of Honour, 1994
 213 W, 5 S, 135 CG, 28 Shutouts and 1757 K.
 Hiroshima Carp Pitching Coach from 2001 to 2004

statistics

External links 
 Japanese Baseball Daily
 This article borrows from the article of the same name in Baseball Reference.com's Bullpen. The Bullpen is a wiki, and its content is available under the GNU free documentation license.
 THE GOLDEN PLAYERS CLUB (Japanese)

1957 births
Living people
Baseball people from Kagoshima Prefecture
Japanese Baseball Hall of Fame inductees
Japanese baseball players
Nippon Professional Baseball pitchers
Hiroshima Toyo Carp players
Nippon Professional Baseball MVP Award winners
Japanese baseball coaches
Nippon Professional Baseball coaches